Mayhara Francine da Silva (born April 9, 1989, in Bauru, Brazil) is a Brazilian volleyball player, a member of the Brazilian team.

Career 
She was part of the national team at the 2015 FIVB World Grand Prix.

She participated at the 2015 FIVB Volleyball Women's Club World Championship, and 2016 FIVB Volleyball Women's Club World Championship with Rexona-Sesc.

Clubs
  Mackenzie (2008–2009)
  Uniara/AFAV (2010–2011)
  Sollys Osasco (2010–2011)
  Rio do Sul (2011–2012)
  Praia Clube (2012–2014)
  Rio de Janeiro (2014–2019)
  Vôlei Bauru (2019–)

Awards

Individuals
 2018 South American Club Championship – "Best Middle Blocker"

Clubs
 2014–15 Brazilian Superliga –  Champion, with Rexona-Ades
 2015–16 Brazilian Superliga –  Champion, with Rexona-Ades
 2016–17 Brazilian Superliga –  Champion, with Rexona-SESC
 2017–18 Brazilian Superliga –  Runner-up, with SESC Rio
 2015 South American Club Championship –  Champion, with Rexona-Ades
 2016 South American Club Championship –  Champion, with Rexona-Ades
 2017 South American Club Championship –  Champion, with Rexona-SESC
 2018 South American Club Championship –  Runner-up, with SESC Rio
 2017 FIVB Club World Championship –  Runner-up, with Rexona-SESC

References

External links 

 FIVB profile   Mayhara Silva Profile @ FIVB

1989 births
Living people
Brazilian women's volleyball players
Opposite hitters
Outside hitters
Universiade silver medalists for Brazil
Universiade medalists in volleyball
Medalists at the 2013 Summer Universiade
People from Bauru
Sportspeople from São Paulo (state)